Dorval Rodrigues (26 February 1935 – 26 December 2021), simply known as Dorval, was a Brazilian footballer who played mainly as a right winger.

Club career
Born in Porto Alegre, Rio Grande do Sul, Dorval represented Internacional and Grêmio as a youth. After failing to make his breakthrough, he moved to lowly locals , where he made his senior debut.

In October 1956, Dorval signed a contract with Santos, after spending some months on trial at the club. He began the 1957 season on loan at Juventus-SP, but returned to Santos after three months as a replacement to Alfredinho, who signed for Grêmio.

Dorval subsequently established himself as a regular starter for Peixe, being a part of the Os Santásticos squad which won several titles and was widely known in the whole world. In 1964, he was sold to Argentine side Racing Club, but returned to Santos in 1965 after the club failed to pay his transfer fee.

Dorval left Santos in 1967, and joined Palmeiras. After having little success with his new club, he moved to Atlético Paranaense in 1968, where he won the 1970 Campeonato Paranaense.

In 1972, after one season with Venezuela's Carabobo, Dorval retired at the age of 37, after playing for Saad. For Santos alone, he scored 194 goals in 612 matches.

International career
Dorval played 13 matches for the Brazil national team, being called up for the 1959 South American Championship in Argentina and making his full international debut on 10 March 1959, in a 2–2 draw against Peru at the Monumental de Núñez. His only goal for the national side occurred on 17 September of that year, in a 7–0 routing of Chile at the Maracanã Stadium.

Death
Dorval died on 26 December 2021, at the age of 86 in a hospital in Santos.

Career statistics

Scores and results list Brazil's goal tally first, score column indicates score after each Dorval goal.

Honours
Santos
Campeonato Paulista: 1958, 1960, 1961, 1962, 1964, 1965
Torneio Rio – São Paulo: 1959, 1963, 1964, 1966
Taça Brasil: 1961, 1962, 1963, 1964, 1965
Copa Libertadores: 1962, 1963
Intercontinental Cup: 1962, 1963

Atlético Paranaense
Campeonato Paranaense: 1970

References

External links
 
 

1935 births
2021 deaths
Footballers from Porto Alegre
Brazilian footballers
Association football wingers
Brazil international footballers
Grêmio Foot-Ball Porto Alegrense players
Santos FC players
Clube Atlético Juventus players
Club Athletico Paranaense players
Sociedade Esportiva Palmeiras players
Saad Esporte Clube players
Argentine Primera División players
Racing Club de Avellaneda footballers
Carabobo F.C. players
Brazilian expatriate footballers
Brazilian expatriate sportspeople in Argentina
Brazilian expatriate sportspeople in Venezuela
Expatriate footballers in Argentina
Expatriate footballers in Venezuela